Andreas Paraskevas (born 15 September 1998) is a Cypriot footballer who plays as a goalkeeper for Doxa Katokopias.

Career
Paraskevas made his professional debut for APOEL in the Cypriot First Division on 25 November 2017, starting in the home match against Olympiakos Nicosia, which finished as a 6–1 win.

References

External links
 
 

1998 births
Living people
Cypriot footballers
Cyprus youth international footballers
Cyprus under-21 international footballers
Association football goalkeepers
APOEL FC players
Othellos Athienou F.C. players
Doxa Katokopias FC players
Cypriot First Division players
Cypriot Second Division players